Mong La or Mongla, also known as Little Mong La to distinguish it from neighbouring Mengla County in China, is the administrative seat of Mong La Township in Shan State, Myanmar.

 
Although Mong La is in Myanmar, its electricity, telecommunications, other infrastructure, and trade flows are dependent on China. The main currency used in Mong La is the Chinese yuan.

Name
Mong La, Mengla and Meungla are differing Romanizations of the same Tai word. Both the e and the o should be pronounced like the Scottish pronunciation of u in bucks. To differentiate Mengla County in China and Mong La Township/settlement in Myanmar the locals call the former "Greater Mengla/Mongla" and the latter "Lesser Mongla/Mengla".  in Jinping County also bears the same name but is too distant to cause confusion.

History

Mong La emerged from a small remote village in the 1990s to become a local version of Las Vegas. The National Democratic Alliance Army (NDAA) operates in the Mong La area.

Mong La casinos were closed in January 2005 for about a year because of complaints from the Government of China. Mong La has a history of rapid expansion, but in the late 2000s, its economy was in decline. Tourism from Thailand to Mong La resumed in 2012 after the signing of new cease fire agreement between the Burmese military government and the Mong La NDAA in September 2011.

There has been an increase in illegal wildlife trafficking in the region. Mong La has emerged as a significant hub of the pangolin trade and during four visits in 2006, 2009, 2013–2014 and 2015, a total of 42 bags of pangolin scales, 32 whole skins, 16 foetuses or pangolin parts in wine and 27 whole pangolins were observed for sale. Wildlife products from Africa, such as African elephant ivory and white rhino horn, have been observed openly for sale in Mong La, indicating this hub is being used to move such items into China.

References

External links
Burma Road
Undercover in Myanmar's Sin city where anything goes - BBC News

Township capitals of Myanmar
Populated places in Shan State
Tourism in Myanmar
China–Myanmar border crossings